Daishan Dao is a Type 920 hospital ship of the People's Liberation Army Navy of the People's Republic of China. Daishan Dao is also known as Peace Ark during peacetime, and has received NATO reporting name Anwei class (meaning comfort).

Daishan Dao is the lead ship and the only ship in her class, Type 920 hospital ship.

History
The ship was launched in 2007 with the stated intention of giving China a platform to provide a better means to providing quicker humanitarian response to disasters around the world, but others contend it also allows China to extend the navy's blue water capabilities.

On 1 September 2010, the hospital ship embarked on a three-month "Harmonious Mission 2010" to the Gulf of Aden with a total of 428 officers including 100 medical workers. En route she visited and provided medical treatment to the local people of Djibouti, Tanzania, Kenya, the Seychelles and Bangladesh.

During "Harmonious Mission 2011", Peace Ark visited Cuba, Costa Rica, Jamaica, and Trinidad and Tobago, the first Chinese voyage to the Caribbean.

In November 2013, she was deployed to Tacloban, Philippines to assist in the recovery from Typhoon Haiyan.<ref>{{cite news|url=http://www.scmp.com/news/asia/article/1362240/chinese-hospital-ship-peace-arks-friendship-mission-philippines|title=Chinese hospital ship Peace Ark'''s on 'friendship' mission to Philippines|publisher=South China Morning Post|date=November 21, 2013}}</ref>Peace Ark also participated as part of the Chinese contribution to Exercise RIMPAC 2014 in addition to the United States hospital ship USNS Mercy.

During "Harmonious Mission 2015", Peace Ark visited Australia, Barbados, French Polynesia, Grenada, Mexico, Peru, and the United States.Timeline 2010--2019

In October 2017, she traveled to Gabon and provided medical services in the country. According to media, her crew examined more than 3000 people and performed dozens of surgeries.

CharacteristicsDaishan Dao is the sole ship of its class, and is assigned pennant number 866. She is assigned to the South Sea Fleet and based out of Zhoushan in Zhejiang province. She has a capacity of 300 beds, 20 ICU beds, 8 operating theatres, and can perform 40 major surgeries a day, in addition to X-ray, ultrasound, CT, hypothermia, hemodialysis, traditional Chinese medicine, and dental facilities. She is also equipped with a remote networking and communications system to allow teleconferencing with doctors and specialists on land.

In accordance with the Geneva Conventions, Daishan Dao and her crew do not carry any offensive weapons, while the ship is painted white with red crosses to mark her as a hospital ship.

Gallery

Similar vessels

 Other PLAN hospital ships:
 832 Nanyun and 833 Nankang - two Nankang-class hospital ship are 2150-ton modified Qiongsha class attack transport ships built in the 1980s and similar size to small passenger ships; has a helipad at the stern; built in Guangzhou and remains in service in the South Sea Fleet
 Y832 (Bei Kang) and Y834 (Dong Kang'') - stationed at North Sea Fleet and East Sea Fleet
 82 Shichang - 9 500 ton part-time hospital ship built in 1997 as multi-role aviation training ship and can be reclassified as hospital ship/defense mobilization ship with modular units added; deck space can accommodate modular units for treatment centre and wards; supports two helipads
 865 Zhuanghe - (approximately 30,000 ton) converted container ship with 14 modular medical units, heli pad and control tower; likely based at Sanya, Hainan Island
 Project 320 Ob' Class Hospital Ship - a retired Russian hospital ship (1980–1997) was purchased in 2007 with plans to restore it for PLAN service as hospital ship; built at Adolf Worski Shipyard in the 1980s
 United States Navy 70,000 tons :

References

External links
 Type 920 Hospital ship
 Mystery Chinese Hospital ship 866
 China's first self-made medical ship
 Type 920 Anwei-class Hospital Ship

Ships built in China
2007 ships
Hospital ships
Auxiliary ships of the People's Liberation Army Navy